The Bonan language (pronounced , Baonang; Chinese: 保安语, Bǎo'ānyǔ; Amdo Tibetan: Dorké) is the Mongolic language of the Bonan people of China. As of 1985, it was spoken by about 8,000 people, including about 75% of the total Bonan ethnic population and many ethnic Monguor, in Gansu and Qinghai Provinces. There are several dialects, which are influenced to varying degrees — but always heavily — by Chinese and Tibetan, while bilingualism in Wutun is less common. The most commonly studied is the Tongren dialect. There is no writing system in use. The language is also referred to as "Manegacha", natively.

Phonology 

Bonan phonology has been heavily influenced by Tibetan. Consonants possess a voicedness contrast. Initial consonant clusters of mostly falling sonority are present in native words, as are heavy diphthongs, though the content of both is heavily restricted.

Ñantoq Baoan has six vowels /a, e, ə, i, ɵ, u/, with long counterparts for all except /ə/.

Morphology 

Bonan, like other Mongolic languages, is agglutinative.

There are five case markings for Bonan nouns: Nominative, Accusative-Genitive, Dative-Locative, Ablative-Comparative, and Instrumentative.

Verbal morphology is quite complex. Evidentiality is marked in the indicative mood as "definite" or "indefinite" with a specific suffix or with an auxiliary verb. The present definite is used to mark naturally occurring phenomena, while the present indefinite indicates the habits of animals. The indefinite may also mark volition. The future, continuous, and perfective suffixes also possess markers for evidentiality that are often used to mark negation.

Syntax 

Bonan has a primary SOV (subject–object–verb), but topicalization of an object is common. It is known for its peculiar double marking of the copula. A Mongolic copula, of which there are several with different meanings, comes sentence-finally, following Bonan SOV word order, while a copula  from Chinese  "to be" appears between the copula's subject and complement, as in Chinese SVO word order. This Chinese copula is optional and is used to emphasize the subject. The definite, but not indefinite, copula can also act as a participle following some finite verbs. For example:

Uniquely among Mongolic languages, adjectives follow the noun they modify. This is due to Tibetan influence.

Notes

References 

 
 
 
 
 
 

Agglutinative languages
Definitely endangered languages
Languages of China
Southern Mongolic languages
Subject–object–verb languages
Bonans
Mongolic languages